Maharero kaTjamuaha (Otjiherero: Maharero, son of Tjamuaha, short: Maharero;  1820 – 7 October 1890) was one of the most powerful paramount chiefs of the Herero people in South-West Africa, today's Namibia.

Early life

Maharero, was born about 1820 at Okahandja. In 1843 he went with his father Tjamuaha to Windhoek to stay with Jonker Afrikaner, Captain of the Oorlam Afrikaners. Tjamuaha was an ally of Jonker Afrikaner until his death in 1861, albeit in a subordinate position. Maharero a leader of Ovaherero community in (1861-1890) was born in ca 1820 at Otjikune near Okahandja and he was the son of Tjamuaha and his chief wife Tjorozumo. He had several brothers and half-brothers, amongst them were Kavezeri, Kariteova, Kavikunua and Rijarua.

Like his father, Maharero became an ally of Jonker Afrikaner in 1843. As from 1863 onwards, he refused to accept the dominance of the Afrikaners and was recognized by both Herero’s and the European in the country as the representative of all the Hereros. Shortly afterwards he emerged as the first Herero paramount chief though his leadership was not uncontested. He sought to consolidate his position by marrying into all the important Hereros families and he apparently had over 60 wives by the time he was old.

In 1885 he signed a treaty accepting German protection over the country. When he died on October 5, 1890 a serious dispute about his succession erupted. Maharero’s brother Kavezeri, who was born in 1845, became custodian of the sacred fire. His other brother Kavikunua, who had already died in 1858, had a son named Nikodemus (Kambahahiza). Owing to Nikodemus powerful personality he had been in a strong position to become paramount chief of Hereroland but had obviously not been successful. As a result, Maharero requested his son Samuel Maharero to succeed as chief of the Hereros living in the east and Ovambanderu under Kahimemua and Tjetjoo. His request was supported by the German governor, who subsequently appointed Nikodemus in his new position. Sadly this brought so many arguments on this leadership style, which finally led to both Nikodemus and Kahimemua being captured and executed in Okahandja in 1896.

Herero-Orlam hostilities
When Jonker Afrikaner died, he was succeeded by Christian Afrikaner. Due to this, Maharero rebelled against the Afrikaners. They subsequently attacked Maharero's men at Otjimbingwe on 15 June 1863, a battle in which Christian Afrikaner was killed.

Christian's successor, Jan Jonker Afrikaner did not want to allow the Hereros to escape from his overlordship, and so hostilities continued for several years.

Some traders at Otjimbingwe, notably C.J. Andersson and Frederick Green, considered that the war was bad for trade, and took a hand in organising and leading the Herero army. Green led a force that captured most of the Oorlams cattle, and on 22 June 1864 there was a decisive battle in which Jan Jonker Afrikaner's forces were defeated.

Dispensing with the services of the traders, Maharero won more battles, and took control of Damaraland, and even sent his forces into Namaqualand. Eventually in 1870 a peace was brokered by missionary Carl Hugo Hahn of the Rhenish Missionary Society.

In the decade that followed, many more white traders entered Damaraland, mostly from the Cape Colony. More serious still were the Boer incursions into the Herero lands from the Boer republics to the east. Maharero complained to the governor of the Cape Colony about Boers entering the eastern part of the territory. The Cape government sent the Palgrave Commission, and later annexed Walvis Bay in 1878, though this was not actually part of Maharero's territory.

In 1880, there were renewed hostilities between Maharero and Jan Jonker Afrikaner. What was originally a dispute over grazing escalated into a pogrom against all Nama living in Maharero's territory, and over 200 were killed. One who escaped with his life was Hendrik Witbooi, who thereafter led the opposition to Maharero.

Also faced with repeated attacks by the ǀKhowesin, a subtribe of the Khoikhoi under Hendrik Witbooi, Maharero signed a protection treaty with Imperial Germany's colonial governor Göring on 21 October 1885 but did not cede the land of the Herero. Due to lack of German support against Witbooi, Maharero renounced this treaty in 1888 and reopened negotiations with the government of the Cape Colony. But by that time the Scramble for Africa was under way, and the Cape Colony government was powerless to intervene, even if it had wanted to. The European powers had by then recognised South West Africa as a German sphere of influence. Maharero reaffirmed the treaty with the Germans in May 1890.

Maharero died on 7 October 1890 in Okahandja. Historian Heinrich Vedder claims that his main wife Kataree poisoned him in order to prevent him from changing his mind on who his successor should be. His eldest son Samuel Maharero succeeded him as chief of the Herero.

References

Bibliography 

 
 
 

Herero people
1820s births
1890 deaths
People from Otjozondjupa Region
Namibian revolutionaries